Censored is an animated short, directed by Frank Tashlin, produced by Leon Schlesinger and first released in July 1944. It is part of the Private Snafu series.

Plot 
 
The film opens at nighttime with Snafu attempting to send a message to his girlfriend Sally Lou. He is certain that his unit is going to be sent to the South Pacific Ocean. While attempting to crawl past the censor's office, Snafu triggers an electric eye. He is detected and his message in censored. He later attempts to send a second message in the form of a paper airplane, and a third through a carrier pigeon. In each case the message is intercepted by the ever-vigilant censors.

Finally, the Technical Fairy 1st Class turns up and agrees to pass a coded message to Sally Lou. It contains the exact location of the next big operation, the island of Bingo Bango. Unfortunately, Sally Lou decides to pass the information on to her mother. From there the information spreads through gossip until it reaches the Japanese lines. A buck-toothed and bespectacled soldier notifies Tokyo. The island receives massive reinforcements and camouflaged fortifications.

By the time Snafu and his unit do arrive, a trap is set for them. The entire invasion force is trapped—then Snafu wakes up from a nightmare. The Fairy hands him back his letter and Snafu personally censors the letter to Sally Lou, preventing the disaster.

Censorship 

Ironically, a topless image of Sally Lou was censored and edited out.

Sources

References

Externals
 

1944 animated films
1944 films
Private Snafu
Films directed by Frank Tashlin
Articles containing video clips
Films set in Japan
Anti-Japanese sentiment
Pacific War films
Films scored by Carl Stalling
Films produced by Leon Schlesinger
American black-and-white films
1944 comedy films
1940s Warner Bros. animated short films
1940s American films